Lassen Hotel may refer to:

 Lassen Hotel (Cedar Lake, Indiana), listed on the National Register of Historic Places (NRHP) in Lake County, Indiana
 Lassen Hotel (Wichita, Kansas), NRHP-listed